David Aebischer (born February 7, 1978) is a Swiss former professional ice hockey goaltender who played in the National Hockey League with the Colorado Avalanche, Montreal Canadiens and the Phoenix Coyotes. He was a member of the 2001 Stanley Cup champion Avalanche team, becoming the first Swiss native to achieve the feat. Aebischer also played several seasons in his native Switzerland with HC Fribourg-Gottéron, HC Lugano and the Rapperswil-Jona Lakers of the National League (NL).

Aebischer is currently a goalie coach for HC Fribourg-Gottéron.

Playing career
As a youth, Aebischer played in the 1992 Quebec International Pee-Wee Hockey Tournament with a team from Switzerland.

Aebischer was drafted 161st overall by the Colorado Avalanche in the 1997 NHL Entry Draft. He moved to North America in 1997 and spent the 1997–98 season in the ECHL, first with the Chesapeake Icebreakers and then with the Wheeling Nailers. He spent the next two seasons with Colorado's American Hockey League (AHL) affiliate, the Hershey Bears, with whom he compiled a 46-33-7 record. When the Avalanche traded backup goaltender Marc Denis to the Columbus Blue Jackets in the summer of 2000, Aebischer became the full-time backup to starting goaltender Patrick Roy.

Aebischer played 26 games during his rookie season with Colorado. Aebischer made his NHL debut, and first NHL start on October 18, 2000 against the Columbus Blue Jackets in Columbus for his first NHL victory. On October 26, 2000 in his second career start, Aebischer shut out the Chicago Blackhawks in Chicago for his first NHL career shutout. The year would prove a successful one, as Roy backstopped the Avalanche to their second Stanley Cup championship, defeating the New Jersey Devils in a seven-game final series. With the win, Aebischer became the first Swiss hockey player to win the Stanley Cup.

Following two more seasons as the Avalanche backup, Aebischer became Colorado's starting goaltender following Roy's retirement in the summer of 2003. He played 62 games and posted 32 wins during the 2003–04 season. That season, he started his first career playoff game for the Avalanche and led Colorado to the second round, where they lost to the San Jose Sharks in six games. The following season, due to the NHL lockout, Aebischer returned to Switzerland and played for HC Lugano in the Nationalliga A.

Aebischer returned to the Avalanche for the 2005–06 season. He was unable to duplicate his pre-lockout form and his inconsistent play led to his being traded to the Montreal Canadiens in exchange for goaltender José Théodore on March 8, 2006, a day before the NHL trade deadline.

That summer, Montreal re-signed him to a one-year deal worth $1.9 million. He served as Cristobal Huet's backup for the 2006–07 season and posted a 13–12–3 record. The Canadiens failed to make the playoffs and Montreal opted not to re-sign Aebischer.

On July 19, 2007, Aebischer signed a one-year, $600,000 contract with the Phoenix Coyotes. However, he lost the goaltending battle in training camp to Alex Auld and Mikael Tellqvist, and was waived. He went unclaimed and was subsequently assigned to the Coyotes AHL affiliate, the San Antonio Rampage. On November 23, 2007, Aebischer was loaned to HC Lugano to make room on the San Antonio roster for goaltender Alex Auld.

In August, 2011, after four seasons back in his native Switzerland, Aebischer was invited to the training camp of the Winnipeg Jets for the 2011–12 season on a tryout contract. On October 5, 2011, it was announced that Aebischer would play with the Jets' AHL affiliate, the St. John's IceCaps.

On July 1, 2012, Aebischer again left North America and signed a one-year contract with the Rapperswil-Jona Lakers of the National League A.

In the 2014–15 season, Aebischer played five games with HC Thurgau of the National League B before announcing his retirement from his playing career to focus for a coaching role on January 25, 2015.

International play
Aebischer has represented Switzerland internationally on many occasions. His first international experience came in the 1997 World Junior Ice Hockey Championships, hosted by Switzerland. The Swiss finished in 7th place. Aebischer returned as Switzerland's starting goaltender the following year at the 1998 World Juniors and led the team past the quarterfinal round and to a bronze medal finish, defeating the heavily favoured Czech Republic in the bronze medal match. Aebischer has also appeared for Switzerland in five IIHF World Championships and two Winter Olympic Games.

Career statistics

Regular season and playoffs

International

References

External links

Aebischer at hockeygoalies.org

1978 births
Chesapeake Icebreakers players
Colorado Avalanche draft picks
Colorado Avalanche players
ECH Chur players
HC Fribourg-Gottéron players
HC Lugano players
HC Thurgau players
Hershey Bears players
Ice hockey players at the 2002 Winter Olympics
Ice hockey players at the 2006 Winter Olympics
Living people
Montreal Canadiens players
Olympic ice hockey players of Switzerland
People from Fribourg
Phoenix Coyotes players
SC Rapperswil-Jona Lakers players
St. John's IceCaps players
San Antonio Rampage players
Stanley Cup champions
Swiss ice hockey goaltenders
Wheeling Nailers players
Sportspeople from the canton of Fribourg